Marie Françoise Dumesnil (2 January 171320 February 1803), original name Marie-Françoise Marchand, was a French actress.

She was born in Paris, daughter of a poor nobleman, and began her stage career in the provinces, whence she was summoned in 1737 to make her debut at the Comédie-Française as Clytemnestre in Racine's Iphigénie en Aulide. She at once came into the front rank, playing Cléopâtre, Phèdre, Athalie and Hermione (tragic roles created by contemporary French playwrights) with great effect, and when she created Merope (1743), Voltaire says that she kept the audience in tears for three successive acts.

She retired from the stage in 1776, but lived until 1803. Her rival La Clairon having spoken ill of her, she authorized the publication of a Mémoire de Marie Françoise Dumesnil, en réponse aux mémoires d'Hippolyte Clairon (1800).

See also 
 Troupe of the Comédie-Française in 1752

References

Sociétaires of the Comédie-Française
Actresses from Paris
1713 births
1803 deaths
18th-century French actresses
French stage actresses